Gishnu (also Romanized as Gīshnū) is a village in Tiab Rural District, in the Central District of Minab County, Hormozgan Province, Iran. At the 2006 census, its population was 109, in 24 families.

References 

Populated places in Minab County